Gaudi is the tenth album by The Alan Parsons Project, released in 1987. Gaudi refers to Antoni Gaudí, the Catalan Spanish architect, and the opening track references what is probably Gaudí's best known building, the Sagrada Família.

Project regular David Paton was unable to undertake bass duties on this recording due to a prior touring commitment with Elton John. Saxophonist-keyboardist Richard Cottle's brother, Laurie, was recruited to play bass. The album was recorded at the Grange in Norfolk and Mayfair Studios in London using a pair of Sony 3324 DASH digital tape recorders and mixed to a digital master.

This was the final canonical Alan Parsons Project studio album, as well as vocalist Lenny Zakatek's final contribution to any Parsons album. Although the album The Sicilian Defence was released in 2014, it was originally recorded in 1979 and was never intended to be heard by the public.

During the writing of what would have been the follow-up, Eric Woolfson turned that album into a rock opera, eventually released as Freudiana in 1990. Alan Parsons continued as a solo artist in 1993 with Try Anything Once, an album which completes the musical evolution that started with this album.

A musical by Woolfson with the same name, and based on the songs of this album, was released in 1993 in Germany with the songs sung in English.

Use on television

The songs "Closer to Heaven" and "Money Talks" were used in an episode of the third season of the TV series Miami Vice, with "Paseo de Gracia" (even though in Catalanand officiallythe exact name is "Passeig de Gràcia") appearing in an episode in the show's fifth season.

Track listing
All songs written and composed by Alan Parsons and Eric Woolfson.

Personnel
Eric Woolfson – pianos, keyboards, vocals
Alan Parsons – synthesizer, programming, producer, engineer
Ian Bairnson – guitars
Laurie Cottle – bass
Stuart Elliott – drums, percussion
Richard Cottle – synthesizers, saxophones
John Miles, Lenny Zakatek, Geoff Barradale – vocals 
Chris Rainbow – backing vocals
Andrew Powell – orchestral arrangements
John Heley – cello on "La Sagrada Familia"
David Cripp – horns conductor on "La Sagrada Familia" and "Paseo de Gracia"
Bob Howes – The English Chorale conductor, timpani on "La Sagrada Familia" and "Paseo de Gracia"

Charts

Certifications

Musical

Gaudi was Eric Woolfson's second foray into the world of musical theater. It debuted in Aachen in June 1993. In 1995, a musical cast album was released on CD which, however, omitted a few tracks.

 What Are You Going To Do Now? 5:42
 Money Talks 5:57
 Closer to Heaven 4:40
 Standing on Higher Ground 3:48
 Tango Güell (instrumental) 3:37
 Parca Güell 5:54
 Puppet Master 6:14
 Inside Looking Out 4:26
 Work Song 2:55
 Too Late 5:19
 Forbidden Fruit 6:52
 Lonely Song (Love Can Be Lonely Too) 6:19
 La Sagrada Familia 8:19

More recently, a download version of the musical has been released featuring differing versions to the CD release and three more tracks.

 What Are You Going To Do Now? 5:44
 Money Talks 7:53
 Closer to Heaven 4:42
 Standing on Higher Ground 3:45
 Tango Güell (instrumental) 3:43
 Parca Güell 5:56
 Puppet Master 6:42
 Inside Looking Out 4:28
 Work Song 4:21
 Too Late 5:21
 Forbidden Fruit 6:56
 Lonely Song (Love Can Be Lonely Too) 6:21
 La Sagrada Familia 8:21
 Las Ramblas/It Isn't Funny If It Happens To You 4:59
 Garden of the Warriors 4:21
 Gaudi Visions 6:04

References

The Alan Parsons Project albums
Concept albums
1987 albums
Albums produced by Alan Parsons
Arista Records albums